There are no legally incorporated political parties in the Marshall Islands, but there are unofficial groupings:

 Aelon Kein Ad
 United Democratic Party
 United People's Party

See also
 Politics of the Marshall Islands
 List of political parties by country

Marshall Islands
 
Marshall Islands

Political parties
Parties